Boitumelo Masilo (born 5 August 1995) is a middle-distance runner from Botswana competing primarily in the 800 metres. He represented his country at the 2016 Summer Olympics without advancing from the first round.

His personal best in the event is 1:45.74 set in Wageningen in 2022.

International competitions

References

External links
 

1995 births
Living people
Botswana male middle-distance runners
Athletes (track and field) at the 2015 African Games
Athletes (track and field) at the 2016 Summer Olympics
Olympic athletes of Botswana
Athletes (track and field) at the 2019 African Games
African Games competitors for Botswana